Christopher Kas and Philipp Kohlschreiber were the defending champions, but they lost in semifinals to Tomáš Berdych and Jan Hájek.
Berdych and Hájek went on to win the title, defeating Alexander Peya and Bruno Soares in the final, 6–2, 6–4.

Seeds

Draw

Draw

References
Main draw

Doubles